Escadrille Spa.81 was a French fighter squadron active in World War warfare during 1917 and 1918. With nine flying aces in its ranks, it downed 88 German aircraft. It was twice Cited in orders and entitled to the Fourragere of the Croix de Guerre.

History
Escadrille Spa.81 was formed on 26 December 1916 under the sobriquet Escadrille N.81. It began at Villacoublay Airfield, with a mixed bag of Nieuports. Later on, it would rearm with SPADs and change its unit designation to Escadrille Spa.81.

It was assigned to VI Armee on 5 January 1917. It moved to VII Armee on 29 January. On 17 April, it moved to IV Armee; shortly thereafter, it was incorporated in Groupe de Combat 15 (GC15, in short). GC15 was reassigned to II Armee sector on 25 July 1917. From then until war's end, as part of a larger formation, Escadrille Spa.81 was frequently shifted into tactical situations on the Western Front in a "fire brigade" fashion.

In January 1918, they were Cited in orders. Its second citation came on 4 October 1918. This entitled the unit to display the Fourragere of the Croix de Guerre. By the 11 November 1918 ceasefire, the squadron was credited with destroying 88 German aircraft.

Commanding officers
 Capitaine Maurice Mandinaud: 26 December 1916 - killed in action 10 March 1917
 Lieutenant Raymond Bailly: 10  March 1917
 Lieutenant Adrien L. J. Leps: 24 February 1918.

Notable members

 Capitaine Marcel A. Hugues
 Lieutenant (later Major) Adrien L. J. Leps
 Sous lieutenant (later Colonel) Marcel Marc Dhôme
 Sous lieutenant Andre Herbelin
 Sous lieutenant Pierre De Cazenove De Pradines
 Adjutant Henri Peronneau
 Adjutant Maurice Rousselle
 Maréchal des logis Paul Santelli
 Maréchal des logis Pierre Cardon.

Aircraft
 Nieuport XII two-seater reconnaissance craft: 26 December 1916
 Nieuport XVII fighters: 26 December 1916
 SPAD fighters.
 SPAD VII: 1917 - 1918
 SPAD XIII: 1918

End notes

Reference
 Franks, Norman; Bailey, Frank (1993). Over the Front: The Complete Record of the Fighter Aces and Units of the United States and French Air Services, 1914–1918 London, UK: Grub Street Publishing. .

 Gutmann, Jon (2001). SPAD VII Aces of World War I. Wellingborough UK: Osprey Publishing.  

Fighter squadrons of the French Air and Space Force
Military units and formations established in 1916
Military units and formations disestablished in 1918
Military units and formations of France in World War I
Military aviation units and formations in World War I